Princess Alexandra, The Honourable Lady Ogilvy (Alexandra Helen Elizabeth Olga Christabel; born 25 December 1936) is a member of the British royal family. Queen Elizabeth II and Alexandra were first cousins through their fathers, King George VI and Prince George, Duke of Kent. Alexandra's mother Princess Marina of Greece and Denmark was also a first cousin of the Queen's husband Prince Philip, Duke of Edinburgh, making Alexandra both a second cousin and first cousin once removed to King Charles III.

Princess Alexandra is the widow of businessman Angus Ogilvy, to whom she was married from 1963 until his death in 2004. At the time of her birth, she was sixth in the line of succession to the British throne; as of September 2022, she is 56th.

Early life

Princess Alexandra was born on 25 December 1936 at 3 Belgrave Square, London. Her parents were Prince George, Duke of Kent, the fourth son of King George V and Queen Mary, and Princess Marina of Greece and Denmark, a daughter of Prince Nicholas of Greece and Denmark and Grand Duchess Elena Vladimirovna of Russia. She was named after her paternal great-grandmother, Queen Alexandra; her grandmother, Grand Duchess Elena Vladimirovna of Russia; and both of her maternal aunts, Countess Elizabeth of Törring-Jettenbach and Princess Olga of Yugoslavia. She received the name Christabel because she was born on Christmas Day, like her aunt Princess Alice, Duchess of Gloucester. Her birth was the last to have the tradition of having the Home Secretary present to verify the birth of potential heirs to the throne. John Simon was present and was the last one to do so.

As a male-line granddaughter of the British monarch, she was styled as a British princess with the prefix Her Royal Highness. At the time of her birth, she was sixth in the line of succession to the British throne, behind her cousins Elizabeth and Margaret, her uncle the Duke of Gloucester, her father the Duke of Kent, and her elder brother Prince Edward. She was born two weeks after the abdication of her uncle King Edward VIII.

The Princess was baptised in the Private Chapel of Buckingham Palace, on 9 February 1937, and her godparents were King George VI and Queen Elizabeth (her paternal uncle and aunt); the Queen of Norway (her great-aunt); Princess Nicholas of Greece and Denmark (her maternal grandmother); Princess Olga of Yugoslavia (her maternal aunt); the Princess Beatrice (her paternal great-great-aunt); the Earl of Athlone (her paternal great-uncle); and Count Karl Theodor of Törring-Jettenbach (her maternal uncle by marriage). Of her godparents, only the King and Queen and Lord Athlone were present.

Princess Alexandra spent most of her childhood at her family's country house, Coppins, in Buckinghamshire. She lived with her grandmother, Queen Mary, the widow of George V, during World War II at Badminton. Her father was killed in an aeroplane crash in Caithness, Scotland, on 25 August 1942 while serving in the Royal Air Force. Princess Alexandra has the distinction of being the first British princess to have attended a boarding school, Heathfield School near Ascot. She then studied in Paris. She was also trained at Great Ormond Street Hospital.

Marriage and personal life

On 24 April 1963, she married The Hon. Angus James Bruce Ogilvy (1928–2004), second son of David Ogilvy, 12th Earl of Airlie and Lady Alexandra Coke, at Westminster Abbey. Ogilvy presented Alexandra with an engagement ring made of a cabochon sapphire set in gold and surrounded by diamonds on both sides. The wedding ceremony was attended by the royal family and was broadcast worldwide on television, watched by an estimated 200 million people.

The bride wore a wedding gown of Valenciennes lace, with matching veil and train, designed by John Cavanagh. She made her way with her brother, the Duke of Kent, from Kensington Palace to the church. The bridesmaids included Princess Anne and Archduchess Elisabeth of Austria, and the best man was Peregrine Fairfax. The Archbishop of Canterbury Michael Ramsey conducted the service. Angus Ogilvy declined the Queen's offer to be created an earl upon marriage, so their children carry no titles.

Angus Ogilvy was knighted in 1988 (when Princess Alexandra assumed the style of The Hon. Lady Ogilvy), later being sworn of the Privy Council in 1997. Princess Alexandra and Angus Ogilvy had two children, James and Marina, and four grandchildren:
 James Robert Bruce Ogilvy (born 29 February 1964 in Thatched House Lodge, Richmond Park, Surrey). He married Julia Caroline Rawlinson on 30 July 1988 at St Mary's Church in Saffron Walden, Essex. The couple have issue:
 Flora Alexandra Vesterberg (born 15 December 1994 in Edinburgh, Scotland). She married Timothy Vesterberg at Chapel Royal, St James's Palace, on 26 September 2020.
 Alexander Charles Ogilvy (born 12 November 1996 in Edinburgh, Scotland). 
 Marina Victoria Alexandra Ogilvy (born 31 July 1966 in Thatched House Lodge, Richmond Park, Surrey) she married Paul Julian Mowatt (Hendon, 28 November 1962) on 2 February 1990 and divorced on 15 October 1997. They have two children:
 Zenouska May Mowatt (born 26 May 1990 in Roehampton, England). Currently works as Head of Marketing for Halcyon Days Ltd.
 Christian Alexander Mowatt (born 4 June 1993 in London, England)

Marina's first pregnancy, which was announced in late 1989, caused a controversy as the couple were not married. This resulted in a feud with her parents who suggested she either marry her companion or have an abortion. In an interview with a tabloid at the time, Marina had claimed that her parents had cut off her trust fund and monthly allowance due to their disapproval of her conduct.

Activities

Beginning in the late 1950s, Princess Alexandra carried out an extensive programme of engagements in support of the Queen, both in the United Kingdom and overseas. Taking part in roughly 120 engagements each year, Princess Alexandra was one of the most active members of the royal family. She made 110 engagements in 2012. However, in late June 2013, she cancelled her engagements due to arthritis. As of 2022, she is still listed as a working member of the royal family, attending numerous ceremonial and charitable engagements.

In 1959, she carried out an extensive tour of Australia, and attended the Queensland Centenary Celebrations. The Alexandra Waltz was composed for this visit by radio announcer Russ Tyson, and television musical director, Clyde Collins. It was sung for the princess by teen-aged Gay Kahler, who later changed her name to Gay Kayler. In 1961, Princess Alexandra visited Hong Kong and made a visit to Aberdeen Fish Market, Lok Ma Chau police station and So Uk Estate, a public housing complex. Princess Alexandra returned to Australia in 1967 for a private holiday, but also carried out engagements in Canberra and Melbourne. The Princess Alexandra Hospital in Brisbane is named in her honour.

Princess Alexandra represented the Queen when Nigeria gained its independence from the United Kingdom on 1 October 1960, and opened the first Parliament on 3 October. Later overseas tours included visits to Canada, Italy, Oman, Hungary, Norway, Japan, Thailand, Gibraltar and the Falkland Islands. Princess Alexandra launched the New Zealand Leander-class frigate HMNZS Waikato at Harland and Wolff, Belfast, Northern Ireland in 1965. Princess Alexandra opened the Victoria to Brixton section of London Underground's Victoria line on 23 July 1971.

Princess Alexandra opened the new hospital in Harlow, Essex, named in her honour on 27 April 1965. The Princess Alexandra Hospital NHS Trust was announced by the Prime Minister, Boris Johnson, in September 2019 to be part of the government's new health infrastructure programme to build a new hospital.

Princess Alexandra served as chancellor of Lancaster University from its foundation in 1964 until she relinquished the post in 2004 (when she also accepted an honorary degree in Music). She also served as the first chancellor of the University of Mauritius. She is also an honorary fellow of the Royal College of Physicians and Surgeons of Glasgow, Faculty of Anæsthetists of the Royal College of Surgeons of England, the Royal College of Obstetricians and Gynaecologists, and the Royal College of Physicians. She is also the president of Alexandra Rose Day, which was founded in honour of her great-grandmother, Queen Alexandra. She was also patron of The Royal School, Hampstead. The Princess was president of WWF-UK until 2011.

Until it was abolished in 2013, Princess Alexandra received £225,000 per year from the Civil List to cover the cost of official expenses, although as with the other members of the royal family (except the Duke of Edinburgh) the Queen repaid this amount to the treasury. Alexandra lives at Thatched House Lodge in Richmond, London, a Crown property purchased on a 150-year lease from the Crown Estate Commissioners by Angus Ogilvy after their wedding in 1963. She also has use of a grace-and-favour apartment at St James's Palace in London.

The Princess is the patron of the Blackie Foundation Trust, a charity dedicated to the promotion of research and education in homoeopathy. She is also a patron of the People's Dispensary for Sick Animals; the English National Opera; the London Philharmonic Choir; the Bournemouth Symphony Orchestra; Wigmore Hall; the Florence Nightingale Foundation; the not-for-profit housing association Anchor; the charity Independent Age; St Christopher's Hospice in Sydenham, England; Core, a National charity in London dedicated to funding research into digestive diseases and which also publishes information leaflets on the most common diseases of the gut and liver; the Nature in Art Trust; and the London Academy of Music and Dramatic Art (LAMDA), the oldest drama school in the English-speaking world. She has been the patron of the Royal Alexandra Children's Hospital in Brighton since 1954 and of Alzheimer's Society since 1990. She is also the royal patron of Children and Families Across Borders (CFAB), a charity dedicated to reuniting children who have been separated from their families. She is patron of the Royal Central School of Speech and Drama in London, which received its royal style in 2012 during the Queen's Diamond Jubilee. In her role as president of Sightsavers UK, the Princess visited Washington D.C. in October 2016 to attend the Neglected Tropical Diseases NGDO Network conference partnership reception. In November 2016, one month ahead of Alexandra's 80th birthday, the Queen held a reception at Buckingham Palace in honour of the work of Alexandra's charities.

Titles, styles, honours and arms

Titles and styles
 25 December 1936 – 24 April 1963: Her Royal Highness Princess Alexandra of Kent
 24 April 1963 – 31 December 1988: Her Royal Highness Princess Alexandra, The Honourable Mrs Ogilvy
 31 December 1988 – present: Her Royal Highness Princess Alexandra, The Honourable Lady Ogilvy

Honours

  12 May 1937: King George VI Coronation Medal
  1951: Royal Family Order of King George VI
  1952: Royal Family Order of Queen Elizabeth II
  2 June 1953: Queen Elizabeth II Coronation Medal
  25 December 1960: Dame Grand Cross of the Royal Victorian Order (GCVO)
  16 June 2003: Royal Knight Companion of the Most Noble Order of the Garter (KG)
  Canadian Forces Decoration (CD) with 4 Clasps
 1967: Order of the Dogwood
Foreign
  1962: Grand Cordon of the Order of the Precious Crown
 18 November 1982: Grand Cross of the Order of the Crown
: Grand Cross of the Order of Chula Chom Klao

Eponyms
 The Princess Alexandra Auditorium, Yarm School.
 The Alexandra Hospital in Redditch, Worcestershire is named after the Princess which she opened on 2 April 1987.
 The Princess Alexandra Hospital in Harlow, Essex, was named by the Princess on 27 April 1965.
 The Princess Alexandra Hospital (formerly South Brisbane Hospital) was named by and in honour of the visit by the Princess to Queensland in 1959.
 The Princess Alexandra Gardens at Leeds Castle are named after her in honour of her involvement as Patron of the Leeds Castle Foundation

Appointments
Academic
 1964–2004: University of Lancaster, Chancellor
 1972–1996: University of Mauritius, Chancellor
Honorary academic degrees
 University of Queensland, Doctor of Laws
 University of Hong Kong, Doctor of Laws
 University of Mauritius, Doctor of Laws
 University of Liverpool, Doctor of Laws
 University of Lancaster, Doctor of Musical Arts

Honorary military appointments
 Canada
 1960–2010: Colonel-in-Chief, The Queen's Own Rifles of Canada
 1977: Colonel-in-Chief, The Canadian Scottish Regiment (Princess Mary's)

 United Kingdom
 1955: Patron, Queen Alexandra's Royal Naval Nursing Service
 1998: Lady Sponsor, of 
 1957–1968: Colonel-in-Chief, of Durham Light Infantry
 1968–2002: Deputy Colonel-in-Chief, of Light Infantry
 1977–2006: Colonel-in-Chief, of King's Own Royal Border Regiment
 2002–2007: Colonel-in-Chief, of Light Infantry
 1975: Royal Honorary Colonel, of The Royal Yeomanry
 1992: Deputy Colonel-in-Chief, of The Queen's Royal Lancers
 2007: Royal Colonel, 3rd Battalion The Rifles
 1966: Patron and Air Chief Commandant, of Princess Mary's Royal Air Force Nursing Service
 2000–2012: Honorary Air Commodore, of RAF Cottesmore

 Hong Kong
1969–1997: Commandant General, Royal Hong Kong Police Force

Arms

Issue

Ancestry
Since Princess Alexandra's mother was a first cousin of Prince Philip, Duke of Edinburgh, she is a second cousin to King Charles III and his siblings, in addition to being their first cousin once removed because her father was Queen Elizabeth II's uncle.

Notes

References

Bibliography

External links

Princess Alexandra at the Royal Family website
Princess Alexandra Hospital, Australia
Sardauna Hosts Princess Alexandra at Sokoto Durbar | Independence Celebrations | Oct. 1960

 in England and Wales and in Northern Ireland

1936 births
Living people
British princesses
Dames Grand Cross of the Royal Victorian Order
Daughters of British dukes
Honorary air commodores
House of Windsor
Ladies of the Garter
People associated with Lancaster University
People educated at Heathfield School, Ascot
Princess Mary's Royal Air Force Nursing Service officers
Residents of Thatched House Lodge
Royal Air Force air marshals
Queen's Own Rifles of Canada
Wives of knights
Wives of younger sons of peers